In Greek mythology, Scylla (Skylla) was a princess of Megara as daughter of King Nisus.

Family 
Scylla's mother was possibly Abrota, daughter of King Onchestus. She was the sister to Eurynome and Iphinoe.

Mythology 
As the story goes, Nisus possessed a single lock of purple hair which granted him and the city invincibility. When Minos, the King of Crete, invaded Nisus's kingdom, Scylla saw him from the city's battlements and fell in love with him. In order to win Minos's heart, she decided that she would grant him victory in battle by removing the lock from her father's head and presented it to Minos. Disgusted with her lack of filial devotion, he left Megara immediately. Scylla did not give up easily and started swimming after Minos's boat. She nearly reached him but a sea eagle, into which her father had been metamorphosed after death, drowned her. Scylla was transformed into a seabird (ciris, perhaps an egret), relentlessly pursued by her father, who was transformed into a sea eagle (haliaeetus).

Scylla's story is a close parallel to that of Comaetho, daughter of Pterelaus. Similar stories were told of Pisidice (princess of Methymna) and of Leucophrye. The story of al-Nadirah told by al-Tabari and early Islamic writers are considered by Theodor Nöldeke to be derived from the tale of Scylla.

Scylla appears in Alexander Pope's mock-heroic "Rape of the Lock" as part of an extended representation of gallant chatter round a card table in the guise of a heroic battle:
Ah cease, rash youth! desist ere 'tis too late,Fear the just gods, and think of Scylla's fate!Chang'd to a bird, and sent to flit in air,She dearly pays for Nisus' injur'd hair!

Notes

References 

 Gaius Julius Hyginus, Fabulae from The Myths of Hyginus translated and edited by Mary Grant. University of Kansas Publications in Humanistic Studies. Online version at the Topos Text Project.
 Hesiod, Catalogue of Women from Homeric Hymns, Epic Cycle, Homerica translated by Evelyn-White, H G. Loeb Classical Library Volume 57. London: William Heinemann, 1914. Online version at theio.com
Hesiod, Theogony from The Homeric Hymns and Homerica with an English Translation by Hugh G. Evelyn-White, Cambridge, MA.,Harvard University Press; London, William Heinemann Ltd. 1914. Online version at the Perseus Digital Library. Greek text available from the same website.
Lucius Mestrius Plutarchus, Moralia with an English Translation by Frank Cole Babbitt. Cambridge, MA. Harvard University Press. London. William Heinemann Ltd. 1936. Online version at the Perseus Digital Library. Greek text available from the same website.
 Pausanias, Description of Greece with an English Translation by W.H.S. Jones, Litt.D., and H.A. Ormerod, M.A., in 4 Volumes. Cambridge, MA, Harvard University Press; London, William Heinemann Ltd. 1918. . Online version at the Perseus Digital Library
 Pausanias, Graeciae Descriptio. 3 vols. Leipzig, Teubner. 1903.  Greek text available at the Perseus Digital Library.
 Publius Ovidius Naso, Metamorphoses translated by Brookes More (1859-1942). Boston, Cornhill Publishing Co. 1922. Online version at the Perseus Digital Library.
 Publius Ovidius Naso, Metamorphoses. Hugo Magnus. Gotha (Germany). Friedr. Andr. Perthes. 1892. Latin text available at the Perseus Digital Library.

Princesses in Greek mythology
Metamorphoses into birds in Greek mythology
Megarian characters in Greek mythology
eo:Skilo#Skilo el Megaro